Max Götze (13 October 1880 – 29 October 1944) was a German track cycling racer who competed in the 1908 Summer Olympics.

He won the silver medal together with his teammates Karl Neumer, Rudolf Katzer, and Hermann Martens in the team pursuit. He also competed in the 5000 metres race, but was eliminated in the first round. In the tandem event together with Otto Götze he was dropped out in the semifinals.

At the 1906 Intercalated Games in Athens he was also able to win a silver medal in the tandem event together with Bruno Götze.

References

External links
 

1880 births
1944 deaths
German male cyclists
German track cyclists
Cyclists at the 1906 Intercalated Games
Cyclists at the 1908 Summer Olympics
Olympic silver medalists for Germany
Olympic cyclists of Germany
Place of birth missing
Olympic medalists in cycling
Medalists at the 1908 Summer Olympics
Medalists at the 1906 Intercalated Games
Cyclists from Berlin